Looking Glass is the self-titled debut album released by the band Looking Glass in 1972.

Background
The group had been playing all up and down the East Coast in clubs, and one night they were spotted by Clive Davis at the Whisky a Go Go. Davis, who at the time was the president of Columbia Records, signed them to the Epic Records label. After trying to record two times (once with Steve Cropper in Memphis), the band began working with Bob Liftin and recorded "Brandy (You're a Fine Girl)". It was not released as the single's A-side, but as the B-side to "Don't It Make You Feel Good" in early 1972. The song went unnoticed by most, but not by Harv Moore, a disc jockey in Washington, D.C. The song would go on to peak 6 months after its release, and the album charted for 16 weeks in the U.S.

Track listing

Personnel
Elliot Lurie—Guitars, vocals
Larry Gonsky—Keyboards, vocals
Piet Sweval—Bass, vocals, harp
Jeff Grob—Drum kit
Chuck Connolly—Backup vocals on "Brandy"
Tasha Thomas—Backup vocals on "Don't It Make You Feel Good"
Barbara Massey—Backup vocals on "Don't It Make You Feel Good" (credited as Tasha Thomas and the Feel Good Girls)
Carolyn Davis—Backup vocals on "Don't It Make You Feel Good" (credited as Tasha Thomas and the Feel Good Girls)
Eddie Hinton—(w/ Elliot Lurie) Guitar on "Golden Rainbows"
James Giampa—Congas on "Brandy"
Tim Geelan—Engineer
Wayne Tarnowski—Engineer
Billy Radice-Engineer
Don Ellis—Special thanks
Karmic Guardians—Special thanks
Steve Baron—Special thanks
Steve Paley—Special thanks/Back cover photo
Sandy Linzer—Special thanks
Ed Lee—Cover design
KLN Photos Inc.—Cover photo
Bob Liftin—Producer/Audio Consultant
Mike Gershman—Executive producer
Larry Fallon—Horns/Strings arrangements

All songs published by Evie Music Inc./ Spruce Run Music and Chappell & Co., Inc. (ASCAP)

References

1972 debut albums
Looking Glass (band) albums
Albums arranged by Larry Fallon
Epic Records albums